Sandviken Municipality (Sandvikens kommun) is a municipality in Gävleborg County, in east central Sweden. The seat is the town of Sandviken.

The present municipality was created in 1971 through the amalgamation of the City of Sandviken (itself instituted in 1943) with a number of surrounding rural municipalities.

Coat of arms
The coat of arms was granted to the then City of Sandviken upon its institution in 1943. The device in the middle is a steam hammer. After the municipality reform of 1971 the arms was taken over by the new, larger, entity.

Name
Sandviken means "sandy bay". There are numerous other places by that name throughout Scandinavia.

Sports
Sandviken Municipality was one of the co-arrangers of the 2017 Bandy World Championship, which was held in Göransson Arena, a municipality owned bandy arena in Sandviken.

See also
 Sandvik - engineering company founded in Sandviken

References

External links 

Sandviken - Official site

 
Municipalities of Gävleborg County